Admete gracilior is a species of sea snail, a marine gastropod mollusk in the family Cancellariidae, the nutmeg snails.

Description
The length of the shell varies between 7 mm and 12 mm.

Distribution
This species occurs in the Pacific Ocean from the Aleutians to California, USA

References

 Dall, W.H. (1905) Some new species of mollusks from California. The Nautilus, 18, 123–125
 McLean J.H. (1996). The Prosobranchia. In: Taxonomic Atlas of the Benthic Fauna of the Santa Maria Basin and Western Santa Barbara Channel. The Mollusca Part 2 – The Gastropoda. Santa Barbara Museum of Natural History. volume 9: 1–160

External links
 United States National Museum, and William Healey Dall. Descriptions of new species of Mollusca from the North Pacific Ocean in the collection of the United States National Museum. 1919
 Journal of the Washington Academy of Sciences vol. 46, 1956
 Hemmen J. (2007) Recent Cancellariidae. Annotated and illustrated catalogue of Recent Cancellariidae. Privately published, Wiesbaden. 428 pp. [With amendments and corrections taken from Petit R.E. (2012) A critique of, and errata for, Recent Cancellariidae by Jens Hemmen, 2007. Conchologia Ingrata 9: 1–8

Cancellariidae
Gastropods described in 1869